is a former Japanese football player.

Playing career
Takada was born in Okinawa Prefecture on October 21, 1974. After graduating from Waseda University, he joined Japan Football League club Kawasaki Frontale in 1997. He played as mainly defensive midfielder and the club was promoted to new league J2 League in 1999. In 1999, he played as regular player and the club won the champions and was promoted to J1 League in 2000. However he could hardly play in the match in 2000 and the club was relegated to J2 in a year. He left the club end of 2001 season. In 2004, he joined Japan Soccer College and played in 2 seasons. He retired end of 2005 season.

Club statistics

References

External links

1974 births
Living people
Waseda University alumni
Association football people from Okinawa Prefecture
Japanese footballers
J1 League players
J2 League players
Japan Football League (1992–1998) players
Kawasaki Frontale players
Japan Soccer College players
Association football midfielders